The European Parliament election of 2014 took place in Italy on 25 May 2014.

In Piedmont the Democratic Party was by far the largest party with 40.8% of the vote, largely distancing the Five Star Movement (21.6%) and Forza Italia (15.8%). The three most voted candidates in the region were Mercedes Bresso (Democratic Party, 55,616), Alberto Cirio (32,310) and Matteo Salvini (Lega Nord, 31,947).

Results

References

Elections in Piedmont
European Parliament elections in Italy
2014 European Parliament election
2014 elections in Italy